Jamar Malachi Neighbors (born January 25, 1986) is an American actor and comedian. He is known for his stand-up comedy and roles in Keanu and What Would Diplo Do?.

Neighbors was born and raised in Compton, California. As a child, he was inspired by Martin Lawrence on Def Comedy Jam.

Discography

Filmography

Film

Television

References

External links

American male film actors
21st-century American comedians
Living people
African-American male actors
1986 births
21st-century African-American people
20th-century African-American people